SkyEye is a combo 2D and 3D-CG Chinese animated TV series in China.

Background
The production budget is estimated to be 24 million RMB (about $US 3 million).  Crew also include staff from the Central Academy of Drama, CCTV and Beijing Film Academy involving hundreds of people. It was voted one of China's top 10 domestic animations in 2006.

Story
The story is about a boy with a magical eye in the sky instituting justice and honesty.

References

2005 Chinese television series debuts
2000s animated television series
China Central Television original programming
Chinese children's animated television series
Computer-animated television series